The 2019 Los Angeles special elections were held on March 5, 2019, and June 4, 2019. Voters elected candidates in a nonpartisan primary, with runoff elections scheduled for May 14, 2019 and August 13, 2019. One of the fifteen seats in the City Council were up for election while one of the seven seats in the Board of Education were up for election.

Two seats were up for election due to the vacancy of two members, councilman Mitchell Englander of District 12 and Ref Rodriguez of Board District 5, who both resigned in the wake of felony charges against them. The Board District 5 did not have an appointed representative unlike Council District 12, who had previous councilmember Greig Smith installed to finish the term.

Municipal elections in California are officially nonpartisan; candidates' party affiliations do not appear on the ballot.

City Council

District 12

Candidates 
John Lee, chief of staff of vacated councilmember Mitchell Englander
Loraine Lundquist, educator and scientist
Scott Abrams, director of constituent service offices for Congressman Brad Sherman
Carlos Amador, human rights and civil rights advocate
Jay Beeber, executive director of Safer Streets L.A.
Annie Cho, entrepreneur
Jeffery Daar, attorney
Frank Ferry, former Mayor of Santa Clarita
Jack Kayajian, administrator for the office of City Attorney Mike Feuer
Stella T. Maloyan, executive at Los Angeles Alliance for a New Economy
Raji Rab, pilot and flight instructor
Brandon Saario, actor
Navraj Singh, small business owner
Joshua Michael Yeager, Chatsworth Neighborhood Council member

Did not make ballot 
Jason Aula
David F. Balen
Michael Benedetto, President of the Granada Hills South Neighborhood Council
Pamela Bolin, Northridge West Neighborhood Council member
Daniel Garcia, principal at Praetorian Resource
Jose Luis Gonzalez, recreation facility director
Hugh Schurtz, consultant and spokesperson
Daniel Tsurif, vice president of Artist Management & Digital Strategy at BRXND
Serena Oberstein, former L.A. Ethics Commissioner

Withdrew 
Charles Sean Dinse, police senior lead
Brandii Grace, game designer and educator

Results

LAUSD Board of Education

District 5

Candidates 
Jackie Goldberg, former Assemblymember for the 45th district, Councilmember for District 13, and board member for District 3
Heather Repenning, director of external affairs for Mayor Eric Garcetti
Allison Bajracharya, former operations and strategy chief at the Camino Nuevo Charter Academy
Ana Cubas, professor at East Los Angeles College and founder and president of Latina Public Service Academy
Cynthia Gonzalez, principal at Diego Rivera Learning Complex
Graciela Ortiz, Huntington Park councilwoman and social worker
Rocio Rivas, community representative
Salvador "Chamba" Sanchez, professor at Los Angeles City College, community activist and former janitor union organizer
David Valdez, Los Angeles County arts commissioner
Nestor Enrique Valencia, City of Bell councilmember

Did not make ballot 
Laura Garza, politician and garment worker

Withdrew 
Erika Alvarez, teacher
Eduardo Cisneros, director of National Census Program and former field director for former Board member Yolie Flores
Scott Cody, teacher, Instructional Support Specialist, and adjunct professor at USC Rossier School of Education
Bennett Kayser, former Board member
Fidencio Joel Gallardo, City of Bell councilmember
James O'Gabhann III, teacher
Justine Gonzalez, president of the City of Los Angeles Human Relations Commission

Results

References 

2019 California elections
Local elections in California
Elections in Los Angeles